Yzeron is a commune in the Rhône department in eastern France.

Population

See also

Communes of the Rhône department

References

Communes of Rhône (department)